Ypsolopha manniella is a moth of the family Ypsolophidae. It is known from Crete and Turkey.

The wingspan is 14–16 mm.

The larvae feed on Ephedra species.

References

External links
lepiforum.de

Ypsolophidae
Moths of Europe
Moths of Asia